The Terrors of Ice and Darkness is a 1984 novel by the Austrian writer Christoph Ransmayr. It tells the stories of the 1872–74 Austro-Hungarian North Pole expedition, of a young Italian man who disappeared in 1981 while researching the expedition, and of the narrator, who tries to figure out what happened to the Italian.

Publication
The book was published in Germany in 1984. An English translation by John E. Woods was published in 1991 through Grove Press.

Reception
Publishers Weekly wrote: "This aggressively intelligent narrative transforms the polar regions into unusually fertile ground." Geoffrey Moorhouse wrote in The New York Times: "Were it not for the invented character of Mazzini there would be no justification for categorizing Mr. Ransmayr's book as a novel at all. ... As a result, this is to some extent a book of information about difficult travel in one of the bleakest places on earth." The critic wrote that the book also is "about a number of psychological factors inseparable from quests", and "most important of all, the novelist strips away the spurious glamour that usually attaches itself to the idea of hard traveling."

References

External links
 American publicity page

Fiction set in 1872
Fiction set in 1873
Fiction set in 1874
Fiction set in 1981
1984 novels
20th-century Austrian novels
Austrian historical novels
German-language novels
Novels by Christoph Ransmayr
Novels set in the Arctic